Miriya may refer to:

 Miriya, Balaghat, a village in Madhya Pradesh, India
 Miriya Parina, a character from Robotech